Bisinusia is a monotypic snout moth genus described by Hans Georg Amsel in 1956. Its single species, Bisinusia palmipes, was described by Cajetan Felder, Rudolf Felder and  Alois Friedrich Rogenhofer in 1875. It is found in South America, including Amazonas and Venezuela.

References

Chrysauginae
Monotypic moth genera
Moths of South America
Pyralidae genera
Taxa named by Hans Georg Amsel